Calappilia is an extinct genus of box crabs belonging to the family Calappidae. The type species of the genus is Calappilia verrucosa.

Fossils of crabs within this genus have been found in Italy, United States, Mexico, Chile, and Brazil from Paleogene to Miocene (age range: 55.8 to 15.97 Ma).

Species 
Species within this genus include:

 Calappilia bohmi 
 Calappilia bonairensis  Van Straelen 1933
 Calappilia borneoensis  Van Straelen 1924
 Calappilia brooksi  Ross & Scolaro 1964
 Calappilia calculosa  Rumsey, Klompmaker & Portell 2016
 Calappilia chilensis  Feldmann et al. 2005
 Calappilia circularis  Beurlen 1958
 Calappilia dacica  Bittner 1893
 Calappilia diglypta  Stenzel 1934
 Calappilia gemmata  Beschin 1994
 Calappilia gorodiskii  Remy 1959
 Calappilia hondoensis  Rathbun 1930
 Calappilia incisa  Bittner 1886
 Calappilia mainii  Allasinaz 1987 (reassigned by some authors to Stenodromia)
 Calappilia matzkei  Bachmayer 1962
 Calappilia maxwelli  Feldmann 1993
 Calappilia ocalanus  Ross 1964
 Calappilia perlata  Noetling 1885
 Calappilia scopuli  Quayle and Collins 1981
 Calappilia sexdentata  Milne-Edwards 1876
 Calappilia sitzi  Blow & Manning 1996
 Calappilia subovata  Beschin 2002
 Calappilia tridentata  Beurlen 1939
 Calappilia verrucosa  Milne-Edwards 1873
 Calappilia vicetina  Fabiani 1910

Distribution 
Fossils of Calappilia have been found in:

Paleogene
 Bateque, San Juan and Tepetate Formations, Mexico
 Cava Main di Arzignano, Italy
 Vincentown Formation, New Jersey
 Castle Hayne Limestone, North Carolina
 Stone City Formation, Texas
 Barton Beds, United Kingdom
Miocene
 Pirabas Formation, Brazil
 Navidad Formation, Chile

References 

Calappoidea
Paleogene genus first appearances
Miocene genus extinctions
Eocene animals of Europe
Fossils of Italy
Fossils of Great Britain
Paleogene animals of North America
Fossils of Mexico
Fossils of New Jersey
Fossils of North Carolina
Miocene animals of South America
Neogene Brazil
Fossils of Brazil
Neogene Chile
Fossils of Chile
Fossil taxa described in 1873
Taxa named by Alphonse Milne-Edwards